Yaniv d'Or (born 11 March 1975) is an Israeli British countertenor. His main field is opera.

Biography 
Yaniv d'Or was born as Yaniv Nehaisi in Holon, Israel. His parents are from Maghrebi Jewish origin, with his grandparents coming from Libya. He studied at the Jerusalem Academy of Music and Dance and Guildhall School of Music and Drama in London. He performed in operas around the world, including Rome, Vilnius, Antwerp, St. Gallen, Ghent, Gothenburg, Wiesbaden and at the Queen Elizabeth Hall. D'Or performed for Queen Elisabeth II in Westminster Hall. He mostly sings baroque repertoire including oratorios, liturgicals, lieder and contemporary classical music. In recent years he has lived alternately in London and Tel Aviv and appears mainly in Europe and Israel. He is younger brother of Israeli singer David D'Or.

Ensemble NAYA 
Yaniv D'Or founded Ensemble NAYA in 2008.

Repertoire

Opera

Discography

References

External links 

1975 births
Living people
21st-century Israeli male opera singers
Operatic countertenors